Bushmasters may refer to:

 Lachesis (genus), a genus of venomous pit vipers found in forested areas of Central and South America
 158th Infantry Regiment (United States), of the Arizona Army National Guard, nicknamed the "Bushmasters"

See also
 Bushmaster (disambiguation)